Halil Zorba (born 22 September 1988) is a British weightlifter. He represented England at the 2010 Commonwealth Games, and was in contention for the British team for the 2012 Summer Olympics but was ultimately not chosen for the team despite being British Champion in his weight class. He competes part-time, continuing with his career as a civil engineer.

Early life
Halil Zorba was born on 22 September 1988, and is of Turkish Cypriot heritage. He attended Bethnal Green Technology College, where he was taught PE by 1964 Olympian George Manners. He took up weightlifting whilst at the college, before going to University, and he receives funding support to compete from the National Lottery.

Career
He broke into the world's top 100 in his weight division, 69 kg, at the age of 19, and was ranked second in the British senior rankings. A back injury saw him miss the 2008 European Championships. He represented England at the 2010 Commonwealth Games in Delhi; competing in the 69 kg category, he managed to come 4th in group B and went on to finish 10th overall out of 18.

At the 2011 World Weightlifting Championships, he lifted  in the snatch, setting a new personal best; however, he suffered an injury to his leg prior to the clean and jerk, resulting in a lift of only . This resulted in the combined weight being less than the minimum standard to be considered for the 2012 Summer Olympics.

Zorba went into the English Championships seeking to make the Olympic qualifying standard. Following the breaking of the record, he twice attempted to lift , but failed on each occasion. His performance made Zorba the second British competitor to meet the Olympic standard after Jack Oliver.

He was named to the British team for the 2012 European Weightlifting Championships. He was a candidate for one of the three male weightlifting spots for the host country at the 2012 Olympics, having won the British Championship at the British Olympic trials in addition to achieving the B qualifying standard. However, he was not chosen for the British team, with Oliver, Peter Kirkbride and Gareth Evans chosen instead.

Zorba trains at the Crystal Palace National Sports Centre with coach Keith Morgan. Zorba remains British record holder in several categories, including both the clean and jerk and the snatch in the 69 kg category of the men's under eighteen competition, and the clean and jerk in both the 69 kg and 77 kg categories of the men's under 23 competition.

Personal life
Zorba is related to the former British javelin thrower and multiple medal-winner Fatima Whitbread on his mother's side of the family. He works as a civil engineer full-time having qualified from the University of Brighton, splitting his time between that and his sport.

References 

Living people
1988 births
British male weightlifters
British people of Turkish Cypriot descent
Weightlifters at the 2010 Commonwealth Games
Commonwealth Games competitors for England
21st-century British people